Jean Boucher is a Canadian politician in Quebec, who was elected to the National Assembly of Quebec in the 2014 election. He represented the electoral district of Ungava as a member of the Quebec Liberal Party.

Prior to his election to the legislature, Boucher worked as a lawyer and as an administrator of low-income housing for the Kativik Municipal Housing Office in Kuujjuaq.

Electoral Record

References

Quebec Liberal Party MNAs
Living people
French Quebecers
People from Nunavik
21st-century Canadian politicians
Year of birth missing (living people)